Neha Dubey is an Indian psychotherapist based in Mumbai and former actress who occasionally appears in Hindi theatre and films.

Biography
Dubey was born in Ahmedabad to Lillete Dubey and her husband Ravi, former senior vice-president, corporate communications, in the (Tata Group). She has one sister, Ira, who is also an actress.

Career as psychiatric counselor
Dubey trained at the Regent's College School of Psychotherapy in London. She then worked at Guy's Hospital and the Psychotherapy Center of LACAP (London Association of Counsellors and Psychotherapists) in London. She now has a private practice in Worli, Mumbai.

Career as actress
From her days in high school and college, Dubey acted bit roles, almost all of them uncredited, in plays staged by Primetime Theatre Company, the troupe to which her mother Lillete Dubey belonged. It was while she was a student of Psychiatry in London that Neha made her major theatre debut. She appeared in the West End as Olivia in Stephen Beresford's production of Shakespeare's Twelfth Night. During her time in London, she played several minor roles for TV and films where Indian/Asian characters were called for. These included a number of independent films, including Monsoon Wedding, Bow Barracks Forever and Manasarovar.

Filmography
My Bollywood Bride (2006)
Bye Bye Miss Goodnight (2005)
Bow Barracks Forever (2004)
Sau Jhooth Ek Sach (2004)
Manasarovar (2004)
Munnabhai M.B.B.S. (2003)
The Perfect Husband (2003)
Monsoon Wedding (2001)

References

External links

Indian film actresses
Living people
Year of birth missing (living people)